Leonardo Adelino da Silva Lopes (born 30 November 1998) is a Portuguese professional footballer who plays as a central midfielder for Cercle Brugge.

Career

Peterborough United
Lopes joined the Peterborough United academy in 2013 when he was 14 years old. He previously played at youth level for the Powerleague Colts, when he was 13 in 2012. Lopes signed a senior contract on 10 March 2015 along with four other graduates (Harry Anderson, Jack Friend, Jonny Edwards and Tobi Adebayo-Rowling). He made his senior debut in a 4–3 victory against Crawley Town on 25 April 2015. He scored his first goal for Peterborough in a 3–1 EFL Cup loss against Swansea City on 23 August 2016. He scored his first league goals when he scored twice in a 4–2 win over Bristol Rovers on 22 April 2017.

Wigan Athletic
It was announced on 5 June 2018 that Lopes had completed a transfer to Wigan Athletic for an undisclosed fee, thought to be around £1.5 million. On 31 January 2019, after making just 3 appearances for Wigan in all competitions, he joined EFL League One side Gillingham on loan for the remainder of the 2018–19 season. At Gillingham he scored once in a 4–2 win over AFC Wimbledon.

Hull City
On 8 August 2019, Lopes joined fellow Championship club Hull City for an undisclosed fee on a three-year deal. Lopes made his first appearance for Hull City in the First round of the EFL Cup in the 0–3 away win against Tranmere Rovers.
He scored his first goal for the club on 14 February 2020 when he opened the scoring in a 4–4 draw against Swansea City.

Cercle Brugge
On 10 September 2020, Lopes joined Belgian club Cercle Brugge for an undisclosed fee.

International career
Lopes has represented Portugal at under-20 level, making his debut in March 2018, in a 1–0 loss to Germany U20 in a Under 20 Elite League match.

Career statistics

References

External links

1998 births
Living people
Portuguese people of Cape Verdean descent
Footballers from Lisbon
Portuguese footballers
Association football midfielders
Peterborough United F.C. players
Wigan Athletic F.C. players
Gillingham F.C. players
Hull City A.F.C. players
Cercle Brugge K.S.V. players
English Football League players
Belgian Pro League players
Portugal youth international footballers
Portuguese expatriate footballers
Portuguese expatriate sportspeople in England
Portuguese expatriate sportspeople in Belgium
Expatriate footballers in England
Expatriate footballers in Belgium